Nafissatou Diallo may refer to:

 Nafissatou Niang Diallo (1941–1982), Senegalese writer
 Nafissatou Diallo, maid at the centre of the New York v. Strauss-Kahn case